Zytel is a trademark owned by DuPont and used for a number of different high strength, abrasion and impact resistant thermoplastic polyamide formulations of the family more commonly known as nylon. The Zytel product line is based mostly on nylon 66, but also includes grades based on nylon 6 as a matrix, long chain nylons such as nylon 610 (if based on at least one renewable monomer they are branded Zytel RS), and copolymers including a transparent resin called Zytel 330.  Resins based on polyphthalamides are branded 'Zytel HTN'.  The Zytel product range takes advantage of the fact that nylons are one of the most compatible polymers with modifiers and so offers grades  with varying degrees of fiberglass, from 13% to 60%, (to increase stiffness and strength), rubber toughened resins, flame retarded grades. Nylon resins with mineral reinforcement are branded 'Minlon'.

Properties
The properties of Zytel will vary with the specific formulation.  Formulation  Zytel HTN 35% Glass Reinforced Resin, consisting of 35% glass fiber by weight, has a tensile strength of around 30kpsi and a flexural modulus of 1500kpsi under room temperature conditions.  Zytel also offers good chemical resistance to common chemicals such as motor oil, transmission fluid, and methanol, and shows little thermal expansion.  Other additives or treatments may be used to increase toughness, wear resistance, and temperature tolerance.

Uses
An early example of plastic bicycle wheels, using fiberglass reinforced Zytel, were Skyway "Tuff Wheels" for BMX bicycles. In this role any weight penalty was adequately compensated by durability and impact resistance.
Former American 200m and 400m sprinter Michael Johnson used shoes made of Zytel at the Atlanta Olympics. The special gold-colored shoes were made by Nike and weighed just 85 grams.
Zytel is often used for folding knife handles;Spyderco, Benchmade, Grohmann,  Leatherman Tool Group, Smith & Wesson, Fallkniven, Gerber Legendary Blades, SARGE Knives, Cold Steel, CRKT and SOG Specialty Knives (among many others) use fiberglass-filled versions of Zytel in many of their lightweight pocket knives
Zytel is also used for the projectile in some less lethal  shotgun shells
The intake manifold of the PT Cruiser GT is made of Zytel, as is an oil conduit in a Volkswagen transmission
Rollerblade Aggressive inline skates use Zytel in the Grind Plates.
Zytel is used in the frame and grip assemblies in many of the firearms manufactured by Kel-Tec.
The original Laser roller skates had the plates and trucks made from Zytel.
The frame of the Smith & Wesson M&P pistol is made of this material.

References

External links
DuPont plastics page
Rugers Firearms

DuPont products
Glass applications
Thermoplastics
Polyamides